Robert William Henry Seely  (born 1 June 1966) is a British Conservative Party politician who has served as the Member of Parliament (MP) for the Isle of Wight since June 2017. He was re-elected at the general election in December 2019 with an increased vote and majority. Seely is a former journalist and soldier. From 1990 to 1995, he worked as a foreign correspondent in the USSR/post-Soviet states. From 2008 to 2017, he served in the British Armed Forces on the Iraq, Afghanistan, Libya and ISIS campaigns.

Early life and career
Seely was born on 1 June 1966 in Marylebone, London. He was educated in North London at Arnold House School and Harrow School, and studied at King's College London.

Military 

Seely served as both an NCO and officer in the UK Armed Forces. As a sergeant in the British Army, he was awarded a Joint Commanders Commendation in 2009 for his tour in Iraq. He then served on the Afghanistan, Libya and ISIS campaigns. Seely was later commissioned as an officer.

Seely was awarded the Military MBE in the 2016 Operational Awards and Honours List whilst serving in the Intelligence Corps.

Academia 
Seely has been a research associate at the Changing Character of War Programme at the University of Oxford.

The Kremlin's hybrid warfare 
In June 2018 Seely produced a definition of Russian hybrid war, in a paper entitled "A Definition of Contemporary Russian Conflict: how does the Kremlin Wage War?" The peer reviewed paper was produced by the Henry Jackson Society and presented in an event in the House of Commons on 4 June.

Investigation into Huawei 
On 16 May 2019 Seely co-authored, with Peter Varnish and John Hemmings, an investigation into the Chinese tech giant Huawei and its possible role in the development of 5G. The report, published by the Henry Jackson Society, recommended barring Huawei from involvement in the UK's 5G infrastructure network. The report was endorsed by both Sir Richard Dearlove and former Australian Prime Minister Malcolm Turnbull.

Surkov leaks report 
In July 2019 Seely wrote for the Royal United Service Institute (RUSI) on the Surkov leaks, analysing the leaked emails to provide "a guide to Russian subversive warfare". Seely argued that: "Russia's modern practice of political subversion can be understood as a reinvention of 'active measures', a form of political conflict pioneered by the Soviet Union."

2022 Doctoral thesis on Ways of Contemporary Russian Warfare
Seely's PhD in International Security Studies was awarded by King’s College, London, in April 2022 for a thesis entitled: "Uniting Ways of War for Perpetual Conflict, An Examination of Contemporary Russian Warfare".

Political career
Seely's political career began as a personal assistant to Shaun Woodward, until Woodward's defection to the Labour Party in 1999. Following this he worked at Conservative Central Office as an adviser of foreign affairs to Michael Howard, Francis Maude and Sir Malcolm Rifkind.

Elections

In 2005, Seely stood in the Broxtowe constituency but lost to the sitting Labour MP Nick Palmer by 2,296 votes.

In 2013, he was elected for the Central Wight ward on the Isle of Wight Council for the Conservatives, and retained the seat in 2017. After the decision by sitting Conservative MP Andrew Turner to stand down at the 2017 general election, Seely was selected as the candidate for the Isle of Wight seat.  During his campaign, he suggested that were he to be elected, he would campaign for improvements to the Island Line rail network. He resigned as a county Councillor in late 2017.

In the 2017 United Kingdom general election which returned Theresa May to office, Seely gained 38,190 votes, which was 51.3% of the vote.

In the 2019 general election which saw Boris Johnson elected Prime Minister, Seely was re-elected with 56.2% of the votes cast.

First term as MP (2017–2019) 
In his maiden speech, Seely called for a better deal for the Isle of Wight from government. The "They Work For You" website describes Seely as "an occasional rebel". Seely has voted against Government over the 10pm Covid curfew. He also campaigned for the government to make changes to proposed housing and planning laws, to improve the provision of affordable housing and to prevent greenfield sprawl. 

Seely's first vote as a Member of Parliament took place on 28 June 2017, where he voted against removing a pay cap for police and fire services. This was deemed controversial by some following his comments during his election campaign where he praised the emergency services following the fire at Grenfell Tower.

On 12 July 2017 Seely established the All Party Parliamentary Group (APPG) for UK Islands, to promote the interests of islands around the UK. The APPG aimed to encourage MPs and Peers from all political parties to join together to lobby government for their respective islands.

In October 2018 BBC News Online reported that Seely had accepted two free overseas trips abroad costing £4,410, which included a trip to Bahrain paid for by its government.

In October 2018 Seely hosted a press conference in parliament, in conjunction with the online investigative journalist website Bellingcat, to announce the identity of the second Skripal assassin suspect.

Seely was appointed the position of Parliamentary Private Secretary (PPS) to the Ministerial team at the Department for Environment, Food and Rural Affairs in January 2019. On 16 July 2019 Seely resigned from this position following his decision to vote against Government over HS2.

Seely voted in favour of the Police Crime Sentencing and Courts Bill at the second debate on 16 March 2021. The Bill was considered controversial in media reports, in part due to the perceived restrictions it would place on protests and protestors. Seely was subsequently criticised on social media.

Select Committees 
In February 2018 Seely was elected by his Conservative colleagues to sit on the cross-party Foreign Affairs Select Committee, whose remit is to examine the expenditure, administration and policy of the Foreign and Commonwealth Office (FCO).

In July 2018 Seely was elected to the Committees on Arms Export Controls.

Island manifesto 
Seely's manifesto, A Vision for the Island, was published a year after he entered parliament, in July 2018. In it, Seely set out how he believed that the Isle of Wight should develop over the coming decades, and covers areas such as housing, transport, health and education.

Second term as MP (2019–present)

Seely continued his membership on the Foreign Affairs Select Committee.

All-Party Parliamentary Group memberships
Seely was listed Chair & Registered Contact of the APPG on Ukraine, which he joined 30 November 2022. As of February 2023, he also was listed on the Anti-Corruption and Responsible Tax, Dark Skies, Events, Hong Kong, Iraq, Latvia, Lithuania, Mexico, Russia, and South Western Railway APPGs.

Coronavirus pandemic 
In early May 2020, during the COVID-19 pandemic, the Government announced that a contact-tracing app would be trialled on the Isle of Wight, a move for which Seely had lobbied Government. Prior to the lockdown, Seely had warned ministers to ensure the emergency supply to the island, and threatened to amend legislation unless the Government acted. Shortly after, the Department of Transport, the Isle of Wight Council and the IOW Transport Infrastructure Board, announced an emergency package to support the island.

Tens of thousands of people downloaded the app in the initial period, some of whom were off-island. Seely believed that after three weeks or so of the app's use on the island, approximately 55,000 islanders had downloaded it out of 80,000 who were able to do so, equating to a rate of about 70 percent.

In a subsequent article on Conservative Home, Seely argued that working with central Government to pilot national schemes was the best way to ensure the Isle of Wight was able to be at the cutting edge of innovative tech to improve its quality of life, especially in healthcare. He cited the use of drones to supply St Mary's Hospital and money for the island's telemedicine project.

On 22 May 2020 Seely and his then girlfriend (Iona Stewart-Richardson, at that time a reporter for Isle of Wight Radio) attended a gathering in the village of Seaview to speak to Freddy Gray, deputy editor of The Spectator. By attending, Seely breached social distancing restrictions. He stated that he had gone to speak to Gray regarding his article about the app. Seely apologised two weeks later, saying that "I called this wrong". In an interview with Isle of Wight Radio, Seely said he "only had half a sausage" whilst in the garden and did not enter the house.

On 11 June 2020 The Times quoted Seely in a report that the NHS app may have had a role in suppressing the virus on the Isle of Wight. Seely told his local County Press newspaper that the analysis needed more research to ensure its accuracy. "In blunt terms", he said, "this is the best evidence we may get that the app saved lives of Islanders". On the same day, Seely spoke on a House of Commons debate on zoos, welcoming their reopening following the COVID-19 lockdown, and urging the UK Government to support zoos and animal sanctuaries on the island.

"Breaking the China Supply Chain" report 
Seely contributed to an April 2020 study examining the strategic trade dependency on China of the "Five Eyes" group of nations. The report coincided with a letter written by Seely and a group of UK Conservative MPs to request the Government be legally required to update Parliament annually on the UK's strategic trade dependency on China and potentially other nations. The letter – which cited the Henry Jackson Society report – was signed by 21 MPs.

Expenses 
Between September – January 2022 Seely received a total of £6,448.15 for foreign trips from The Victor Pinchuk Foundation and Yalta European Strategy.

Conservative Party leadership

On 31 May 2019 Seely wrote an article for CapX stating that he was supporting Michael Gove in his bid to become leader of the Conservative Party.

In June 2022 Seely voted to have confidence in the Conservative Party leadership of Boris Johnson after receiving council funding assurances.  In the final round of the July–September 2022 Conservative Party leadership election during August of that year, Seely backed Liz Truss to become leader and Prime Minister, arguing that she was the “candidate best able to deal with” the major issues facing the country, particularly on the economy and foreign affairs.

In the further leadership election in 2022 following the collapse of the Truss administration, Seely backed Penny Mordaunt.

Personal life
Seely was born to an English father and German mother. He comes from a family long involved in politics. His great-great-uncle, Jack Seely (later created 1st Baron Mottistone), was MP for the Isle of Wight between 1900 and 1906 and again between 1923 and 1924.

He is a keen swimmer and has swum the Solent a number of times for charity, most recently in August 2020 to raise funds for the West Wight Sports and Community Centre.

In July 2018 Seely took part in the parade for Isle of Wight Pride, where he was joined by Conchita Wurst. In an interview with Pink News following the event, Seely stated that he felt that "for dictators, gays are the new Jews".

Bibliography 
 War and Humanitarian Action in Chechnya (Occasional paper) (Thomas J. Watson Jr. Institute for International Studies, 1996) 
 Russo-Chechen Conflict, 1800–2000: A Deadly Embrace (Soviet Russian Military Experience) (Routledge, 2001)

See also
 Politics of the Isle of Wight

Honours

References

External links
 Bob Seely Official site
 

1966 births
Living people
Alumni of King's College London
British Army personnel of the Iraq War
21st-century British male writers
21st-century British non-fiction writers
British Army personnel of the War in Afghanistan (2001–2021)
Conservative Party (UK) MPs for English constituencies
English people of German descent
Members of Parliament for the Isle of Wight
People educated at Harrow School
Seely family
UK MPs 2017–2019
UK MPs 2019–present